The Kurds in Russia form a major part of the historically significant Kurdish population in the post-Soviet space, with close ties to the Kurdish communities in the Caucasus and Central Asia.  The 2010 Russian census registered a total of 63,818  ethnic Kurds living in Russia.

History
During the early 19th century, the main goal of the Russian Empire was to ensure the neutrality of the Kurds in the wars against Persia and the Ottoman Empire. In the beginning of the 19th century, Kurds settled in Transcaucasia, at a time when Transcaucasia was incorporated into the Russian Empire. In the 20th century, Kurds were persecuted and exterminated by the Turks and Persians, a situation that led Kurds to move to Russian Transcaucasia. 
From 1804–1813 and again in 1826–1828, when the Russian Empire and the Persian Empire were at war, the Russian authorities let Kurds settle in Russia and Armenia. During the Crimean War and the Russo-Turkish War (1877–1878), Kurds moved to Russia and Armenia. According to the Russian Census of 1897, 99,900 Kurds lived in the Russian Empire.

During World War II, one of the most renowned Soviet Kurds was Samand Siabandov, a war hero.

Abdullah Öcalan sought asylum in Russia in 1998.

Kurdish population in Russia

Notable Kurds in Russia

 Qanate Kurdo, Kurdish philologist
 Zara, Musical Artist
 Mikhail Aloyan, Boxer
 Guram Adzhoyev, Footballer
 Guram Adzhoyev (1995), Footballer
 Aziz Shavershian, Russian-born Australian bodybuilder and internet celebrity

See also
Kurdistan Uyezd
Republic of Mahabad

References

External links
A History of Russia's Relations with the Kurds from Ohio State University

 
Kurdish diaspora
Muslim communities of Russia